Anna Galiena (born 22 December 1954) is an Italian actress, best known to English-speaking audiences for her appearances in  Le Mari de la coiffeuse, Jamón, jamón, Being Human and Senso '45.

Movie career
In her youth, Galiena starred in numerous stage plays, including several of Shakespeare's works. She had made over a dozen films, mainly in her native Italy before her role in Le Mari de la coiffeuse brought her to international attention.  She went on to appear in Bigas Luna's Jamón, jamón and went on to make her mainstream Hollywood debut in the Bill Forsyth-directed Being Human  starring Robin Williams. The film was, however, a massive flop.

Since then, Galiena has worked in European cinema, where she is consistently in demand. With over 50 films and many television appearances to her credit, she currently has several films in production, including a prominent supporting role in the film Virgin Territory, starring Hayden Christensen and Mischa Barton. She stars alongside Joaquim de Almeida and Ben Gazzara in the thriller Christopher Roth.

In 2007 she was a member of the jury at the 29th Moscow International Film Festival.

Personal life
Galiena speaks Italian, English, French, and Spanish. In Being Human she speaks Friulian, a Romance language spoken in north-east Italy. She was a member of jury at the Berlin International Film Festival in 2003.

Selected filmography

 Nothing Underneath (1985)
 Sweets from a Stranger (1987)
 Farewell Moscow (1987) 
 Hotel Colonial (1987)
 La fée carabine (1988)
 Willy Signori e vengo da lontano (1989)
 The Hairdresser's Husband (1990)
 Quiet Days in Clichy (1990)
 Jamón Jamón (1992)
 L'Atlantide (1992)  
 No Skin (1993)
 The Great Pumpkin (1993)
 Being Human (1994)
 Mario and the Magician (1994)
 Moses (1995)
 School (1995)
 Three Lives and Only One Death (1996)
 The Leading Man (1996)
 3 (1996)
 My Brother's Gun (1997)
 Excellent Cadavers (1999)
 But Forever in My Mind (1999)
 Off Key (2001)
 Senso '45 (2002)
 The Tulse Luper Suitcases (2003)
 The Citadel (2003)
 Guardians of the Clouds (2004)
 Fade to Black (2006)
 Virgin Territory (2007)
 Flying Lessons (2007)
 Ultimatum (2009)
 Un Amore di Strega (2009)
 Stay Away from Me (2013)
 My Summer in Provence (2014)
 You Can't Save Yourself Alone (2015)
 Like Crazy (2016)

References

External links

  Saverio Ferragina press agent

1954 births
Living people
Actresses from Rome
Italian film actresses
Italian stage actresses
20th-century Italian actresses